Heping Xiqiao Station is a station on Line 5 of the Beijing Subway.

Station layout
The station has an underground island platform.

Exits 
There are 4 exits, lettered A, B, C, and D. Exit A is accessible.

Gallery

References

External links
 

Beijing Subway stations in Chaoyang District
Railway stations in China opened in 2007